John Turn Farm is a historic farm complex located in the Delaware Water Gap National Recreation Area at Middle Smithfield Township, Monroe County, Pennsylvania, USA. The complex includes the lime kiln, smoke house and weave house. The property also includes the site of the demolished main farmhouse, a smaller house, a barn and garage.

It was added to the National Register of Historic Places in 1979.

References

External links

Farms on the National Register of Historic Places in Pennsylvania
Historic American Buildings Survey in Pennsylvania
Buildings and structures in Monroe County, Pennsylvania
National Register of Historic Places in Monroe County, Pennsylvania